Housing Department (房屋署) is a department of Hong Kong Government and is the executive arm of the Hong Kong Housing Authority , managing public housing estates  which is a statutory organisation tasked to develop and implement a public housing programme to help the Government achieve its policy objective on public housing. It reports to the Housing Bureau, which is headed by the Secretary for Housing.

See also
 Hong Kong Housing Authority 
 Chan Kau-tai

References

Public housing in Hong Kong
Hong Kong government departments and agencies